He, She and It (published under the title Body of Glass outside the USA) is a cyberpunk novel by Marge Piercy published in 1991. It won the Arthur C. Clarke Award for Best Science Fiction novel in 1993. The novel examines gender roles, human identity and AI, political economy, environmentalism, love, and storytelling through a suspenseful plot, set in a post-apocalyptic America, of the romance between a human woman and the cyborg created to protect her community from corporate raiders.

Plot summary

The main story of He, She and It is situated in North America in the near future of the year 2059. At that time, the economic and political power is held by a few multis—huge multi-national enterprises with their own social hierarchy that have produced an affluent society. The main part of the population, however, lives in the glop outside of the multis' enclaves within an environment that has mainly been destroyed. Here, life is dominated by poverty, gangs and the law of the stronger man. An exception to this is the so-called free towns that are able to sell their technologies to the multis but remain autonomous. Communication is handled via a network which allows the participants to project themselves into Cyberspace.

When the protagonist Shira loses custody of her son Ari to her ex-husband Josh, she returns from her multi Yakamura-Stichen (Y-S) to her hometown Tikva (Hope in Hebrew) - a Jewish freetown.  There, she starts working on the socialization of the cyborg Yod (the tenth letter in Hebrew and a symbol for God in Kabbalah), who has been created illegally by Avram to protect the city. Yod is the tenth cyborg (a robot with human appearance and programmed human characteristics) in a row of previously failed experiments whose programming has partially been completed by Malkah, Shira's grandmother. While Shira and Yod build up a (sexual) relationship, Shira's childhood sweetheart Gadi, Avram's son, also comes back to Tikva. Gadi returns due to his banishment for sleeping with a young girl. When Malkah is working on a chimaera (security software) to protect the city from online attack, she is attacked by Y-S. Yod, however, is able to prevent the attack. Eventually, Y-S invites Shira to a new hearing concerning the custody of her son. Shira is accompanied by Yod, her mother Riva, and  Nili, a biotechnologically enhanced woman from a nuclear-devastated Israel, when the situation escalates. The Y-S delegation and Riva die in the fight. Thereupon Shira, Malkah and Yod decide to infiltrate the Y-S network base. They manage to get hold of personnel files revealing a conspiracy against Shira and Tikva.

As the next step, Shira and Yod are accompanied by Nili and Gadi into the Glop. Here, they get in contact with an organized underground group in which they discover Riva is still alive and participating in resistance activities.  From the Glop, they travel into the Y-S enclave in Nebraska to kidnap Ari. There, Josh is killed by Yod. Back to Tikva, Shira's family spends some quiet time until Y-S invites them to a further meeting on the net. Y-S demands that Yod be handed over, for Y-S to acquire its technology. Avram agrees to the deal with the hope of creating another cyborg. So, Yod agrees to destroy him/itself when sent to the enclave. However, Yod made sure that his own explosion would cause a synchronous explosion in Avram's lab. As Avram dies in this accident and all his notes are destroyed, the creation of a further cyborg becomes impossible.

Finally, Malkah leaves Tikva with Nili to visit a secret town in post-nuclear holocaust Israel and to profit from the possible biotechnological enhancements. Shira is integrated into Tikva's society further. When she discovers copies of the notes concerning Yod, she initially plans on recreating Yod; ultimately she respects Yod's wishes and destroys them.

The main plot is interwoven with a story Malkah tells Yod that deals with Rabbi Judah Loew who Malkah depicts as her ancestor living in the ghetto of Prague around 1600. To protect the Jewish community from the Christian mob, Loew uses the knowledge of Kabbalah to create the golem Joseph from clay. His granddaughter Chava, a highly educated woman, teaches Joseph to read and write. Joseph successfully protects the ghetto and begins to think of himself as human and makes a plea for his right to a human existence. However, when the pogrom climate calms down, Loew returns Joseph to clay. The two stories are mutually illuminating, both asking what it means to be human both from the perspective of the man-made life and that of those who love the artificial lives.

References

 Ruth Bienstock Anolik (2001) "Appropriating the Golem, Possessing the Dybbuk: Female Retellings of Jewish Tales", IN Mica Howe & Sarah Appleton Aguiar (editors), He Said, She Says: An RSVP to the Male Text. Madison, NJ; London, England: Fairleigh Dickinson UP; Associated UP; 2001. 292 pp.
 Marleen S. Barr (1993) Lost in Space: Probing Feminist Science Fiction and Beyond, Chapel Hill, NC: University of North Carolina Press, 1993.
 Keith M. Booker (1994) "Woman on the Edge of a Genre: The Feminist Dystopias of Marge Piercy", Science-Fiction Studies v.21, n.3, pp. 337–350 (Nov. 1994).
 Bronwen Calvert (2005) "Cyborg Utopia in Marge Piercy's Body of Glass", Foundation: The International Review of Science Fiction, v.34, n.95, pp. 52–61 (Autumn 2005).
 June Deery (1994), "Ectopic and Utopic reproduction: He, She and It", Utopian Studies, v.5, n.2, pp. 36–49 (1994).
 June Deery (2000) "The Biopolitics of Cyberspace: Piercy Hacks Gibson" pp. 87–108 IN: Marleen S. Barr, editor, Future Females, The Next Generation: New Voices and Velocities in Feminist Science Fiction Criticism. Lanham, MD: Rowman & Littlefield; 2000. xi, 323 pp.
 Eleonora Federici (1997) "The Ecriture Féminine of a 'Hideous Progeny': Marge Piercy's He, She and It as a Postmodern Intertext of Mary Shelley's Frankenstein", Versus: Quaderni di Studi Semiotici, v.77-78, pp. 119–143 (May-Dec 1997).
 William S. Haney, "Cyborg Revelation: Marge Piercy's He, She and It", chapter 9 of "Cyberculture, Cyborgs and Science Fiction: Consciousness and the Posthuman (Rodopi 2006)
 Joan Haran (2000) "(Re)Productive Fictions: Reproduction, Embodiment and Feminist Science in Marge Piercy's Science Fiction" pp. 154–68 IN: Karen Sayer & John Moore (editors), Science Fiction, Critical Frontiers. Basingstoke, England; New York, NY: Macmillan; St. Martin's; 2000. xiii, 219 pp.
 Elyce Rae Helford (2001) "The Future of Political Community: Race, Ethnicity, and Class Privilege in Novels by Piercy, Gomez, and Misha", Utopian Studies: Journal of the Society for Utopian Studies, v.12, n.2, pp. 124–42 (2001).
 Heather Hicks (2002) "Striking Cyborgs: Reworking the 'Human' in Marge Piercy's He, She and It pp. 85-106 IN: Mary Flanagan & Austin Booth (editors), Reload: Rethinking Women and Cyberculture. Cambridge, MA: MIT Press; 2002. xiv, 581 pp.
 Helen A. Kuryllo (1994) "Cyborgs, Sorcery, and the Struggle for Utopia", Utopian Studies, v.5, n.2, pp. 50–55 (1994).
 Dunja M. Mohr (2002) "'We're All Cyborgs': Cyberfeminism and the Cyborg as the Transgressive Metaphor of the Future in Marge Piercy's Body of Glass", pp. 306–18 IN: Ursula Pasero and Anja Gottburgsen, Wie Natürlich ist Geschlecht?: Gender und die Konstrucktion von Natur und Technik. Wiesbaden, Germany: Westdeutscher; 2002. 333 pp.
 Dunja M. Mohr (2004) "Cyborg and Cyb(hu)man: The Fine Line of Difference", pp. 120–33 IN: Helene Von Oldenburg and Andrea Sick (editors), Virtual Minds: Congress of Fictitious Figures. Bremen, Germany: Thealit; 2004. 235 pp.
 Vara Neverow, "The Politics of Incorporation and Embodiment: Woman on the Edge of Time and He, She and It as Feminist Epistemologies of Resistance", Utopian Studies, v.5, n.2, pp. 16–35 (1994).
 Marge Piercy, "Telling Stories About Stories", Utopian Studies, v.5, n.2, pp. 1–3 (1994).
 Diane Sautter (1996) "Erotic and Existential Paradoxes of the Golem: Marge Piercy's He, She and It", Journal of the Fantastic in the Arts, v.7, n.2-3 [nos.26-27], pp. 255–68 (1996).
 Anca Vlasopolos (1998) "Technology as Eros's Dart: Cyborgs as Perfect (Male?) Lovers", Foundation: The International Review of Science Fiction v.73, pp. 59–66 (Summer 1998).
 Jenny Wolmark (1994) Aliens and Others: Science Fiction, Feminism, and Postmodernism. London: Harester Wheatsheaf, 1993; Iowa City: University of Iowa Press, 1994.

Footnotes

External links

 Marge Piercy's website

Cyberpunk novels
Feminist science fiction novels
1991 science fiction novels
Post-apocalyptic novels
1991 American novels
Fiction set in 2059
Novels by Marge Piercy